Raji may refer to:

Given name
 Raji James (born 1970), English actor
 Raji Rasaki (born 1947), Nigerian military officer
 Raji Sourani, Palestinian lawyer

Surname
  Azita Raji {1961-2022), Iranian-born American diplomat, bank, and philanthropist
 B. J. Raji (born 1986), American football defensive tackle
 Remi Raji, Nigerian poet
 Toyin Raji (born c. 1970), Nollywood actress

People
 Raji people
 Raji language, a small Tibeto-Burman language of Nepal. Speakers were recently nomadic

Biology
 Raji cell, a human cell line

Technology 

 Raji: An Ancient Epic, a video game released in 2020, set in Ancient India.

See also
 Dialects of Central Iran
 Raci (disambiguation)

Arabic-language surnames
Arabic masculine given names
Language and nationality disambiguation pages